Kai Fagaschinski (born July 10, 1974 in Dannenberg, Lower Saxony) is a Berlin based free improvisational clarinet player and composer. He is self-taught, and his music has been described as "rooted in abstraction, but with an increasingly insidious melodious element."

Discography
"Here Comes The Sun" - with Barbara Romen and Gunter Schneider - Mikroton Recordings (2012)
I’m So Awake/Sleepless I Feel - as a member of The Magic I.D. - Staubgold (2011)
Musik - Ein Porträt in Sehnsucht - with Burkhard Stangl - Erstwhile (2009)
Till My Breath Gives Out - as a member of The Magic I.D. - Erstwhile (2008)
Mainstream - as a member of The International Nothing - Ftarri (2006)
First Time I Ever Saw Your Face - as a member of Kommando Raumschiff Zitrone - Quincunx (2006)
Going Round in Serpentines - with Bernhard Gal - Charhizma (2005)
Los Glissandinos: Stand Clear - Creative Sources (2005)
No Furniture - Creative Sources (2004)
Rebecca [two variations] - Charhizma (2003)

References

External links
Official Site
Interview at Addlimb.org

1974 births
Living people
People from Dannenberg (Elbe)
Free improvisation clarinetists
Avant-garde clarinetists
German jazz clarinetists
German experimental musicians
Avant-garde jazz clarinetists
German composers
21st-century clarinetists